A few narrow-gauge railway lines were built in Denmark, the majority in  gauge. Most railway lines in Denmark were built with standard gauge from the beginning, since the country was fairly densely populated in the 19th century.

Metre-gauge railways
Some 350 km of  gauge lines were constructed by ten companies, three on the island of Bornholm, the rest in the peninsula of Jutland. Among these railway lines were the Skagen Line (converted to standard gauge in 1924), Amtsbanerne på Als, Apenrader Kreisbahn, Haderslebener Kreisbahn, Horsens-Tørring, Horsens-Bryrup and Kolding-Egtved.

Agricultural and field railways
Most notably, narrow-gauge railways in Denmark were built and used by De Danske Sukkerfabrikker (Danish Sugar Corporation) to transport juice from sugar beets from purpose built "juice stations" to the main sugar factories in towns such as Nakskov, Nykøbing and Assens. Around 660 km of  narrow-gauge sugar lines existed in 1941, all were closed in the 1960s. However, a few engines survived with Bloustrød-banen, as well as one engine surviving as a display item in Assens park until the mid-1990s.

There were numerous other industrial and agricultural narrow-gauge railways.

Faxe Jernbane, gauge unclear
The railway is now closed.

Preserved

 Hjerl Hede Frilandsmuseum, steam operated peat railway in an open-air museum

 Blovstrød Banen, 1,2 km steam operated railway
 Hedelands Veteranjernbane, a 5,2 km steam operated in a country park around gravel quarries. A miniature railway is also present.
 Lille Vildmose, 8 km in a former peat extraction area, now a nature reserve. The railroad was dismantled in 2012, but a 0,4 km museum railway has been established at the Lille Vildmose Museum Center ("Vildmosecenteret").

 Mosebrugsbanen, 2,5 km at a peat museum in Stenvad
 MuseumsCenter Hanstholm, 1,2 km on a former ammunition railway. Featured in the film The Olsen Gang in Jutland

 Mønsted Kalkgruber, in a former limestone quarry.

References
A visitor's guide to Scandinavian (Nordic) narrow-gauge railways

Rail infrastructure in Denmark